A box top is the top part of a box.

Box Top or variation may also refer to:

 Boxtop, a proof of purchase
 "Boxtop" (song), a 1958 song by Ike Turner
 The Box Tops, a U.S. rock band
 Box Tops for Education, a program from General Mills

See also
 Box (disambiguation)
 Top (disambiguation)